The 34th Curtis Cup Match was played on July 29 and 30, 2006, at Bandon Dunes Golf Resort near Bandon, Oregon. The United States won 11 to 6 on the Pacific Dunes course. This was the last two-day Curtis Cup, which expanded to three days in 2008.

Format
The contest was a two-day competition, with three foursomes and six singles matches on each day, a total of 18 points.

Each of the 18 matches was worth one point in the larger team competition. If a match was all square after the 18th hole extra holes were not played. Rather, each side earned a half point toward their team total. The team that accumulated at least 9 points won the competition. In the event of a tie, the current holder retained the Cup.

Teams
Eight players for the USA and Great Britain & Ireland participated in the event plus one non-playing captain for each team.

Saturday's matches

Morning foursomes

Afternoon singles

Sunday's matches

Morning foursomes

Afternoon singles

References

External links
Official site
USGA archive
2006 Curtis Cup (about.sports)

Curtis Cup
Golf in Oregon
Curtis Cup
Curtis Cup
Curtis Cup
Curtis Cup